Doubt is a mental state in which the mind remains suspended between two or more contradictory propositions, unable to be certain of any of them. Doubt on an emotional level is indecision between belief and disbelief. It may involve uncertainty, distrust or lack of conviction on certain facts, actions, motives, or decisions. Doubt can result in delaying or rejecting relevant action out of concern for mistakes or missed opportunities.

Psychology
Partial or intermittent negative reinforcement can create an effective climate of fear and doubt.

Philosophy
Descartes employed Cartesian doubt as a pre-eminent methodological tool in his fundamental philosophical investigations.
Branches of philosophy like logic devote much effort to distinguish the dubious, the probable and the certain. Much of illogic rests on dubious assumptions, dubious data or dubious conclusions, with rhetoric, whitewashing, and deception playing their accustomed roles.

Theology

Doubt as a path towards (deeper) belief lies at the heart of the story of Saint Thomas the Apostle. Note in this respect the theological views of Georg Hermes:

... the starting-point and chief principle of every science, and hence of theology also, is not only methodical doubt, but positive doubt. One can believe only what one has perceived to be true from reasonable grounds, and consequently one must have the courage to continue doubting until one has found reliable grounds to satisfy the reason.

Christian existentialists such as Søren Kierkegaard suggest that for one to truly have belief in God, one would also have to doubt one's beliefs about God; the doubt is the rational part of a person's thought involved in weighing evidence, without which the belief would have no real substance. Belief is not a decision based on evidence that, say, certain beliefs about God are true or a certain person is worthy of love. No such evidence could ever be enough to pragmatically justify the kind of total commitment involved in true theological belief or romantic love. Belief involves making that commitment anyway. Kierkegaard thought that to have belief is at the same time to have doubt.

Science
To doubt everything or to believe everything are two equally convenient solutions; both dispense with the necessity of reflection.
—Henri Poincaré, Science and Hypothesis (1905) (from Dover abridged edition of 1952)

The scientific method regularly quantifies doubt, and uses it to determine whether further research is needed. Isaac Asimov, in his essay collection Fact and Fancy, described science as a system for causing and resolving intelligent doubt.

See also
 Doubting Thomas
 Fear, uncertainty and doubt
 Further research is needed
 List of ethics topics
 Methodic doubt
 Philosophical skepticism
 Question
 Reasonable doubt
 Skepticism
Self-doubt

Notes and references

Further reading
 Berger, Peter L. and Zijderveld, Anton (2009). In Praise of Doubt: How to Have Convictions Without Becoming a Fanatic. New York: HarperOne. . A book by two eminent sociologists, one American and the other Dutch.
  This book traces the role of doubt through human history, all over the world, particularly regarding religion.
 Hein, David (Winter 2006). "Faith and Doubt in Rose Macaulay's The Towers of Trebizond". Anglican Theological Review 88 (1): 47–68. .

 
Skepticism
Emotions
Concepts in epistemology